Dirt: Showdown (stylised as DiRT: Showdown) is an arcade racing video game developed and published by Codemasters for Microsoft Windows, OS X, Xbox 360, PlayStation 3, and Linux. It was released on 25 May 2012 in Europe and on 12 June in North America. The OS X version was released on 4 September 2014 in North America. The game was released for Linux on 17 August 2015. The game was also released on Xbox 360 for free as part of Microsoft's Games with Gold promotion from January 1 to 15 January 2016.

Gameplay
The player is entered in a series of "Tour" events, offering a range of races and tournaments to compete in. Winning these events gives the player prize money, which can be spent buying new cars or upgrading existing ones, and unlocks further races. Upon the successful completion of the series final, the next difficulty setting is unlocked, featuring faster opponents and longer races.

Development
The first trailer was released on YouTube on in December 2011. The soundtrack in the trailer was "Earthquake" by Labrinth.

The official gameplay trailer featured the song "Mother of Girl" by Eighteen Nightmares at the Lux. This song is also the lead track in the game.

Reception

The game has received mixed reviews, gaining an average review score of 72% on Metacritic.

GameSpy wrote: "Dirt: Showdown delivers bargain-basement entertainment value for the high, high price of $50. With its neutered physics, limited driving venues, clunky multiplayer, and diminished off-road racing options, discerning arcade racing fans should just write this one off as an unanticipated pothole in Codemaster's trailblazing Dirt series".

PC Gamer wrote: "Dirt: Showdown provides thrills while it lasts, but afterwards you're left wanting the deeper experience of its parents".

See also
 Ambisonics, the audio technology used

References

External links
 

2012 video games
Cancelled Wii U games
Codemasters games
Colin McRae Rally and Dirt series
Ego (game engine) games
Linux games
MacOS games
Multiplayer and single-player video games
PlayStation 3 games
Racing video games
Video games set in Colorado
Video games set in London
Video games set in Los Angeles
Video games set in Mexico
Video games set in Miami
Video games set in Michigan
Video games set in Nevada
Video games set in San Francisco
Video games set in Tokyo
Video games set in Yokohama
Windows games
Xbox 360 games
Video games developed in the United Kingdom